Jos Stelling (born 16 July 1945) is a Dutch film director and screenwriter.

Career
He made his debut as a film director in 1974 with Mariken van Nieumegen, which was selected for the official Cannes competition in 1975.

In 1981 he founded the Dutch Film Days a festival for Dutch directors to give them the possibility to show their films and to create an informal platform for the filmmakers. He continued to serve as chairman and director until the 1991 edition. After he abdicated the festival was renamed the Dutch Film Festival. In 1989 he was a member of the jury at the 16th Moscow International Film Festival. In 2002 he was a member of the jury at the 24th Moscow International Film Festival. He was also the president of the jury of the 1st Odessa International Film Festival.

Stelling is founder and owner of two arthouse cinemas in Utrecht, Springhaver (since 1978) & Louis Hartlooper Complex (since 2004).

Filmography
 Mariken van Nieumeghen (1974)
 Elckerlyc (1975)
 Rembrandt fecit 1669 (1977)
 The Pretenders (1981)
 The Illusionist (1983)
 The Pointsman (De Wisselwachter) (1986)
 The Waiting Room (1995)
 The Flying Dutchman (1995)
 No Trains No Planes (1999)
 The Gas Station (2000)
 The Gallery (2003)
 Duska (2007)
 The Visit (2010) based on a short story of Remco Campert
 The Girl and Death (2012)

Awards and nominations
 1975 - Selected for the Official Competition, 1975 Cannes Film Festival: Mariken van Nieumeghen
 1981 - Nomination Golden Prize, 12th Moscow International Film Festival, for The Pretenders
 2014 -  ShortCutz Amsterdam Career Achievement Award

References

External links

1945 births
Living people
Dutch film directors
Dutch screenwriters
Dutch male screenwriters
Dutch film producers
Golden Calf winners
Mass media people from Utrecht (city)